Barwani or Badwani is a municipal town in Barwani district of Madhya Pradesh, India, that is situated near the left bank of the Narmada River. It is the administrative headquarters of Barwani district and has also served as the capital of the former princely state of Barwani. Barwani is only accessible by road.

Origin of name
The name Barwani originated from the words Bad and Wani. The Forests of "Bad" surrounded the city in old times and "Wani" is an old word meaning "the garden", translating to the Garden of Bad. Despite its official spelling, Barwani is pronounced as "Badwani".

Geography

It has an average elevation of 178 meters (583 feet). The maximum temperature of Barwani in April and May used to reach 48 °C (118 °F), making it one of the hottest places in Central India. However, in recent years, it has cooled down.

The hills of the Satpura Range surround Barwani. The city is also called the "Paris of Nimar" ("area beyond Neem trees"). Nimar is split into East Nimar and West Nimar; Barwani lies in West Nimar. Barwani is famous for its papayas and Bawangaja, a Jain holy place  from Barwani.

Transport

Barwani has no immediate connectivity through rail but is easily accessible via roadways.
The nearest airport is indore.

Railways
Barwani has no direct rail connectivity the nearest station to the town is at Indore. Western Railways (Ratlam Mandal) has a reservation counter in Ambedkar Park on Rajghat Road.

Roads
Barwani is well connected to other parts of Madhya Pradesh and other states via national and state highways. Bus services connect the town with the major and minor cities near Barwani, including Indore, Khandwa, Dhar, Barwaha, Khargone, Mumbai, Ahmedabad, and Vadodara.

Demographics

As of the 2011 Census of India, Barwani had a population of 55,504, consisting of 28,437 males (51%) and 27,067 females (49%).

The population of children aged 0–6 was 6,961 (12.54%). In Barwani Municipality, the male-to-female sex ratio is 1,000:952 against the state average of 1,000:931. The child male-to-female sex ratio in Barwani is around 1000:919, compared with the Madhya Pradesh state average of 1000:918. The literacy rate of Barwani City is 82.10% compared with the state's average of 69.32%. In Barwani, male literacy is around 87.17%, while the female literacy rate is 76.80%.

Schedule Tribes (ST) constitutes 23.29% while Schedule Castes (SC) were 9.95% of the population in Barwani.

Out of the total population, 18,438 were engaged in work or business activity. Of these, 13,957 were males and 4,481 were females. In a census survey, a worker is defined as a person who does business, job, service, and cultivator and labour activity. With 18,438 people in the working population, 89.06% were engaged in Main Work while 10.94% of total workers were engaged in marginal work.

Economy
Economically, Barwani engages in agricultural crops and wood, with several other small industries developing in the area.

Culture

Main festivals
The major festivals of Holi, Raksha Bandhan, Ganesh Utsav, Navratri, Dussehra, Deepavali, Muharram, Gudi Padwa, Gangore, Bhaidooj, Eid al-Fitr and Eid al-Adha, Christmas and Naga Panchami are all celebrated with equal enthusiasm.

Places of interest
 Bawangaja (Jain Mandir)
 Rajghat (Narmada River)

Healthcare
Barwani is prominent in the Nimar and Malwa regions for its healthcare facilities and its private hospitals. Barwani District Hospital is one of the oldest hospitals in Madhya Pradesh.

Notable people

Dr. Anil Kakodkar, India's eminent nuclear physicist, and former chairman of the Atomic Energy Commission of India and the Secretary to the Government of India, Department of Atomic Energy, was born in Barwani.

Gallery

References

 
Cities and towns in Barwani district